KREG-TV (channel 3) is a television station in Glenwood Springs, Colorado, United States, broadcasting the classic television network MeTV. It is owned and operated by Weigel Broadcasting, and has a transmitter atop Sunlight Peak.

Since its purchase in 2020 by Weigel, and given KREG-TV has no signal penetration into the Denver metropolitan area, KREG-TV has been positioned as a station serving the entire Denver media market via cable and satellite, rather than its history as a repeater of stations based in Grand Junction.

History

KCWS
KREG-TV was launched January 28, 1984, by Western Slope Communications, a group of investors, as independent station KCWS on VHF channel 3. It promised the best selection of off-network and first-run syndicated programming available; plus an aggressive regional news operation that pioneered the first long-form morning newscast on Western Slope television.

At its launch, KCWS stated it had "one of the highest shares ever received by an independent station at sign-on". However, the station's construction was hindered by what it said was "one of the worst winters in Colorado history", as well as equipment that was either delayed or damaged; in addition, the station fought with commissioners in Garfield County to locate its transmitter at the Sunlight Peak transmitter site used by its translator system. Mesa County's commissioners refused to allow KCWS to be carried on its translators; this prevented the station from being seen in Grand Junction, the largest community in the Western Slope, until the station was added to United Cable's lineup. In addition, the small size of the Glenwood Springs area meant that advertising dollars were scarce; it didn't help matters that KWGN-TV in Denver had been available on cable for decades in the area. The station underwent three rounds of layoffs, and filed for chapter 11 bankruptcy on June 27, 1984. News was eventually eliminated, and after only five months, KCWS went dark on July 2, 1984, following a Taxi rerun.

Satellite of KREX-TV
In 1987, W. Russell Withers, Jr., owner of KREX-TV, the CBS and NBC affiliate in Grand Junction, bought KCWS; it returned to the air September 16, 1987, as KREG-TV, a satellite of KREX. As a satellite of KREX, KREG had no local news inserts but did have a small office in Carbondale, near Glenwood Springs.

Withers sold KREG-TV, along with KREX-TV, to Hoak Media in 2003. On December 19, 2013, Gray Television, who a month earlier announced its purchase of Hoak Media, sold KREG and its sister stations in Grand Junction (as part of Gray's divestment to comply with FCC rules because it was the owner of KKCO and operator of KJCT in the Grand Junction market) to Nexstar Broadcasting Group for $33.5 million. The sale was completed on June 13, 2014.

Sale to Marquee Broadcasting
On May 10, 2016, Nexstar agreed to sell KREG-TV to Marquee Broadcasting for $350,000; the sale is part of a series of divestitures required following Nexstar's acquisition of Media General due to Federal Communications Commission (FCC) ownership caps. Following the sale, KREG, which is considered to be part of the Denver market, ceased to be a satellite of KREX. KREG went dark on January 5, 2017, saying that ice and snow accumulation and the risk of avalanches had rendered the station's transmitter inaccessible, preventing repairs. On July 1, 2017, KREG-TV returned to the air broadcasting Heroes & Icons programming.

Sale to Weigel Broadcasting
Marquee Broadcasting agreed to sell KREG-TV to Weigel Broadcasting for $2 million on May 30, 2019. The sale was completed on January 2, 2020, making KREG an H&I owned-and-operated station. Later in 2020, MeTV was added on DT1, pushing Heroes & Icons to DT2.

Subchannels
The station's digital signal is multiplexed:

As of 2021, Movies! and Decades on DT4 and DT5 have switched their subchannel locations, with the networks on DT5 and DT4, respectively.

References

External links

Weigel Broadcasting
Television channels and stations established in 1984
1984 establishments in Colorado
REG-TV
MeTV affiliates
Heroes & Icons affiliates
Start TV affiliates
Decades (TV network) affiliates
Movies! affiliates
Story Television affiliates
Glenwood Springs, Colorado